The Vahnikula Kshatriya or Palligaru are a social group found in Karnataka and Tamil Nadu, India, particularly the city of Bengaluru and in Southern Karnataka. The caste is traditionally occupied as growers of flowers and vegetables.

They are generally Hindus. Their main deities are Draupadi and Dharmaraya Swamy. There is a Dharmaraya temple at Halasur Pete which was built in the 11th century AD. Kempegowda, the founder of Bangalore, built four gopuras with this temple as the centre of the city. The Karaga festival celebrated in Narasapura, Malur, Lakkur, Kolar, Bangalore, Hosakote, Anekal, Jakkasandra, venkatapura, chunchgatta, bilekhalli, Huskur and other towns is highly significant to the Vahnikula Kshatriya community. The Vahnikula Kshatriya community in Karnataka speak  Kannada in Karnataka and Tamil in Tamilnadu A Karnataka state government order of 1994 designated the Vahnikula Kshatriya there as members of the Backward Classes.

References

Social groups of Tamil Nadu
Social groups of Karnataka